Davy is a male given name in its own right, as well as a short form (hypocorism) of the name David. Davy may refer to:

People
Davy Armstrong (born 1991), American soccer player
Davy Arnaud (born 1980), American soccer player 
Davy Bonilla (born 1973), French jockey
Davy Brouwers (born 1988), Belgian footballer
Davy Burnaby (1881–1949), British actor 
Davy Crockett (1786–1836), American folk hero, frontiersman, soldier, and politician
Davy Force (1849–1918), American Major League Baseball player
Davy Hyland (born 1955), British politician
Davy Jones, early stage name of David Jones (1947–2016), better known as David Bowie, English singer, songwriter and actor
Davy Jones (baseball) (1880–1972), American Major League Baseball player
Davy Jones (musician) (1945–2012), British musician and actor
Davy Jones (racing driver) (born 1964), American winner of the 24 Hours of Le Mans in 1996
Davy Kaye (1916–1998), British actor
Davy Klaassen (born 1993), Dutch footballer
Davy Pröpper (born 1991), Dutch footballer
Davy Rothbart (born 1975), American writer and filmmaker
Davy Russell (born 1979), Irish jockey
Davy Sardou (born 1978), French actor
Davy Walsh (1923-2016), Irish footballer

Fictional characters 
Davy Gladhand, fictional character in the television series Noddy
Davy Jones, figure of nautical folklore best known from the idiom "Davy Jones' Locker"
Davy Jones (Pirates of the Caribbean), from The Pirates of the Caribbean film series, captain of the Flying Dutchman
Davy Jones, living wooden whale in John R. Neill's 1942 children's fantasy novel Lucky Bucky in Oz

See also
Davy (disambiguation)

English masculine given names
Hypocorisms